Village Academy (VA) was a PK–12 private, co-educational, college-preparatory school in Powell, Ohio, United States. It was established in 1976 and closed on July 19, 2019, due to a decline in enrollment and withdrawal of contracts.

History 
Village Academy Schools was founded under the Learning Unlimited International Schools system in the fall of 1976 as a year-round preschool and kindergarten. The original campus was established directly across from to the Ohio State University. Over the next thirty years, the program expanded to become an independent preparatory school for students in pre-kindergarten through grade twelve. In 2006, the school was re-branded as Village Academy Schools, which consisted of Village Academy (Kindergarten-Grade 12) and the then-named Village Junior Academy (for pre-kindergarten and young kindergarten).

In the fall of 1990, the first phase of a  campus, Village Academy, opened in Powell, Ohio. In 2011, the pre-kindergarten and young kindergarten programs re-joined the main campus, following the completion of the Griffin Hall building.

On July 16, 2019, its board of trustees announced the school would be closing on July 19, 2019, due to a decline in enrollment and withdrawal of contracts.

Athletics

Ohio High School Athletic Association State Championships 

 Boys Golf – 2013 (Individual)

References

External links 
 

High schools in Delaware County, Ohio
Private elementary schools in Ohio
Private middle schools in Ohio
Private high schools in Ohio
Preparatory schools in Ohio
Educational institutions established in 1976
1976 establishments in Ohio
Educational institutions disestablished in 2019
2019 disestablishments in Ohio